Carabus irregularis is a species of ground beetle endemic to Central Europe, Belgium, Italy, Luxembourg, Ukraine and all states of former Yugoslavia (except for North Macedonia).

References

External links
 Carabus (Platycarabus) irregularis on zin.ru

irregularis
Beetles of Europe
Beetles described in 1792